The Academy of Canadian Cinema & Television's 6th Gemini Awards were held in March 1992 to honour achievements in Canadian television. There were no awards issued in 1991, so this year’s awards covered productions from 1991 and 1990. The awards show took place at the Metro Toronto Convention Centre and was broadcast on CBC Television.

Awards

Best Dramatic Series
E.N.G. - Atlantis Communications. Producers: Jennifer Black, Jeff King, Robert Lantos, R.B. Carney
Degrassi Junior High - Playing With Time, Inc. Producers: Kit Hood, Linda Schuyler
Mom P.I. - Atlantis Films, Canadian Broadcasting Corporation. Producers: Jonathan Goodwill, Chris Haddock, Michael MacMillan
Road to Avonlea - Sullivan Entertainment. Producers: Trudy Grant, Kevin Sullivan
Urban Angel - Telescene Films, Canadian Broadcasting Corporation. Producers: Jamie Brown, Paul E. Painter, Robin Spry

Best Short Dramatic Program
Kurt Vonnegut's Monkey House - Atlantis Films, South Pacific Pictures. Producers: Michael MacMillan, Gordon Mark, Jonathan Goodwill, Harold Lee Tichenor
Inside Stories - Canadian Broadcasting Corporation. Producers: Stephen Onda, Ian McLaren
Peggy. Producer: Chris Zimmer
RSVP - Frameline. Producers: Laurie Lynd, Paul Brown

Best TV Movie
Deadly Betrayal: The Bruce Curtis Story - Atlantis Films, Canadian Broadcasting Corporation, National Film Board of Canada, Citadel Communications. Producers: Barry Cowling Seaton McLean, Peter Sussman
Princes in Exile - Cinepix, Canadian Broadcasting Corporation, National Film Board of Canada. Producers: André Link, Colin Neale, Irene Litinsky, John Dunning, Marrin Canell
C.B.C.'s Magic Hour - The Rookies - Atlantis Films. Producers: Martin Harbury, Michael MacMillan, Seaton McLean, Peter Sussman
Getting Married in Buffalo Jump - Canadian Broadcasting Corporation. Producers: Flora Macdonald, Peter Kelly

Best Comedy Program or Series
Codco - Salter Street Films. J. William Ritchie, Stephen Reynolds, Jack Kellum, Michael Donovan
Maniac Mansion - Atlantis Films. Producers: Jamie Paul Rock, Eugene Levy, Seaton McLean, Peter Sussman, Michael Short
The Kids in the Hall - Broadway Video, Canadian Broadcasting Corporation. Producers: Lorne Michaels, Joe Forristal

Donald Brittain Award for Best Social/Political Documentary Program
Island of Whales - National Film Board of Canada. Producers: Jerry Appleton, Gillian Darling-Kovanic, Jack Silberman, George Johnson
Between Two Worlds - Investigative Productions. Producer: Peter Raymont
Distress Signals - Canadian Broadcasting Corporation, TVOntario, Channel 4 Films, Orbit Films, National Film Board of Canada. Producers: Tom Perlmutter, John Walker, Kent Martin
The Nature of Things - James Bay: The Wind That Keeps On Blowing - Canadian Broadcasting Corporation. Producer: Nancy Archibald
Transplant: The Breath of Life - Camera One Productions. Producer: Elias Petras

Best Documentary Series
The Nature of Things - Canadian Broadcasting Corporation. Producer: James Murray
Man Alive - Canadian Broadcasting Corporation. Producer: Louise Lore
End of an Empire. Producers: Kitson Vincent, David M. Ostriker
For the Love of the Game - TSN. Producer: Aiken Scherberger
The Hand of Stalin - BBC, October Films. Producers: Tom Roberts, Bill Nemtin

Best Dramatic Mini-Series
Young Catherine - Canadian Television Network, Consolidated Entertainment, Lenfilm, Primedia Productions, Tele München, Turner Entertainment. Producers: Stephen Smallwood, Michael Deeley, Pat Ferns 
The First Circle - Technisonor. Producer: Claude Héroux

Best Performing Arts Program or Series or Arts Documentary Program or Series
Letter from Wingfield Farm - Primedia Productions. Producers: Ann O’Brian, Pat Ferns
Le Dortoir - Rhombus Media. Producer: Niv Fichman
Master Peter's Puppet Show - Rhombus Media. Producers: Niv Fichman, Larry Weinstein
Musicians in Exile - Jacqués Holender Films. Producer: Jacqués Holender
Pas De Deux with Paul and Isabelle Duchesnay - Canadian Broadcasting Corporation. Producer: Bob McKeown
Sisters - Primedia Productions. Producers: Ann O’Brian, Pat Ferns

Best Variety Series
The Tommy Hunter Show - Canadian Broadcasting Corporation. Producer: Lynn Harvey

Best Variety Program 
Tall in the Saddle - Insight Productions. Producer: John Brunton
Juno Awards of 1991 - Canadian Broadcasting Corporation. Producer: Lynn Harvey
Back to the Beanstalk. Producer: Bernard Rothman
The Heritage Quiz - Canadian Broadcasting Corporation. Producer: Susan Stranks

Best Information Series
The Journal - Canadian Broadcasting Corporation. Producer: Mark Starowicz
the fifth estate - Canadian Broadcasting Corporation. Producer: Kelly Crichton
The Nature of Things - The Genetic Revolution - Canadian Broadcasting Corporation. Producer: Tobias Fisher
Venture - Canadian Broadcasting Corporation. Producer: Duncan McEwan
W5 With Eric Malling - CTV Television Network. Producer: Garry Dwyer-Joyce

Best Light Information Series
The NewMusic - CHUM Limited. Producers: Moses Znaimer, Denise Donlon
LIFE: The Program - Canadian Broadcasting Corporation. Producer: Duncan McEwan
On the Road Again - Canadian Broadcasting Corporation. Producer: Karl Nerenberg
The Shirley Show - Adderley Productions. Producer: Les Kottler
Sunday Arts Entertainment - Canadian Broadcasting Corporation. Producer: Carol Moore-Ede

Best Information Segment
W5 With Eric Malling - CTV Television Network. Producers: Michael Hannan, Robert Holmes, Leora Eisen
Venture - The New Contract - Canadian Broadcasting Corporation. Producers: Willa Marcus, Steve Tonon, Carlos Esteves, Mike MacClymont
The NewMusic - CHUM Limited. Producers: Alfred Tonna, Jennifer Morton
CBC at Six - Canadian Broadcasting Corporation. Producers: Jerry Borys, Lyn Whitham, Peter Zin, Susan Papp, Kathy Priestman
CBC News - License to Steal - Canadian Broadcasting Corporation. Producers: Ross Rutherford, Cecil Rosner, Gloria Lowen, John Bronevich, Douglas Coolidge

Best Animated Program or Series
Babar - Nelvana, Ellipsanime. Producers: Michael Hirsh, Patrick Loubert, Clive A. Smith
The Woman Who Raised a Bear as Her Son - Lacewood Productions, Hinton Animation Studios, CTV Television Network. Producers: Gerald Tripp, Sheldon S. Wiseman 
Madeline - Cinar. Producers: Ronald A. Weinberg, Micheline Charest

Best Youth Program or Series
C.B.C.'s Magic Hour - Lost in the Barrens - Atlantis Films, Muddy River Films, Canadian Broadcasting Corporation. Producers: Michael J. F. Scott, Derek Mazur, Joan Scott, Seaton McLean, Michael McMillan
Diary of a Teenage Smoker - Atlantis Films. Producers: Rachel Low, Daphne Ballon
The NewMusic - Rock ‘n Roll ‘n Reading - CHUM Limited. Producers: Moses Znaimer, Denise Donlon
Too Close for Comfort - Wild Ginger Productions. Producers: Lezlie Wagman, Gay Hawley

Best Children’s Program or Series
The Garden - Heartland Motion Pictures. Producer: Stephen Onda
Take Off - Canamedia Productions. Producers: Hilary Pryor, Les Harris
Join In! - TVOntario. Producer: Jed MacKay

Best Sports Program or Series
Molson Hockey Night in Canada on CBC: 1991 Stanley Cup Playoffs - Canadian Broadcasting Corporation. Producers: Larry Isaac, Mark Askin, Ron Harrison
Donohue's Legends - Nation's Capital Television. Producers: Jack Donohue, Tom Aziz
Michael Smith: Anything is Possible - Canadian Broadcasting Corporation. Producers: Robert MacAskill, Lee Herberman
Sports Weekend - Canadian Broadcasting Corporation. Producers: Joan Mead, Doug Sellars
Sportsline - Global Television Network. Producer: Jim Tatti

Best Special Event Coverage
CBC News - Canadian Broadcasting Corporation. Producers: Arnold Amber, Edith Champagne
Canada Cup Final - Canadian Broadcasting Corporation. Producers: Doug Beeforth, Scott Moore, John Hudson
CBC News - Canadian Broadcasting Corporation. Producers: Arnold Amber, Tom Kavanagh, Fred Parker, George Hoff

Best Direction in a Dramatic Program or Mini-Series
Graeme Campbell - Deadly Betrayal: The Bruce Curtis Story (Atlantis Films/CBC/NFB/Citadel Communications)
Paul Lynch - Drop Dead Gorgeous (First Choice Canadian Communication Corp./Power Pictures)
Laurie Lynd - RSVP (Frameline)
Elise Swerhone - Mayor of Odessa
Donald Shebib - The Little Kidnappers (CBC)

Best Direction in a Dramatic or Comedy Series
Stacey Stewart Curtis - Street Legal (CBC)
Peter Rowe - E.N.G. - Final Cut (Atlantis Communications)
Brad Turner - Mom P.I. - When Sally Met Bernie (Atlantis Films/CBC)
Paul Shapiro - Mom P.I. - Time Wounds All Heels (Atlantis Films/CBC)
Timothy Bond - Top Cops -  Greg Armstrong/Kathy Burke (C.B.I. of Canada)

Best Direction in a Variety or Performing Arts Program or Series
Barbara Willis Sweete, Adrian Marthaler - Prokofiev by Two (Rhombus Media)
Jacqués Holender - Musicians in Exile (Jacqués Holender Films)
David Langer - La Maison Suspendue (Primedia Productions)
Peter Weyman, Robert Lang - Mariposa: Under a Stormy Sky (Lyric Film and Video)
Marla Digiacomo, Faith Feingold - Molson Canadian Rocks (CBC)

Best Direction in an Information or Documentary Program or Series
John Walker - The Hand of Stalin (BBC/October Films)
Michael Poole - Island of Whales (NFB)
F.M. Morrison - Man Alive - The Hero Among Us (CBC)
Maya Gallus - Elizabeth Smart: On the Side of the Angels (Red Queen Productions)
John Zaritsky - Frontline: My Doctor, My Lover (PBS)
Elias Petras - Transplant: The Breath of Life (Camera One Productions)

Best Writing in a Dramatic Program or Mini-Series
Keith Ross Leckie - Deadly Betrayal: The Bruce Curtis Story (Atlantis Films/CBC/NFB/Citadel Communications)
Joe Wiesenfeld - Princes in Exile (Cinepix/CBC/NFB)
Silver Donald Cameron - Peggy
John Frizzell - Getting Married in Buffalo Jump (CBC)
M. Charles Cohen - The First Circle (Technisonor)

Best Writing in a Dramatic Series
Wayne Grigsby - E.N.G. - Ways and Means (Atlantis Communications)
Chris Haddock - Mom P.I. (Atlantis Films/CBC)
Heather Conkie - Road to Avonlea (Sullivan Entertainment)
Suzette Couture - Road to Avonlea (Sullivan Entertainment)
Marlene Matthews - Road to Avonlea (Sullivan Entertainment)

Best Writing in a Comedy or Variety Program or Series
Mary Walsh, Cathy Jones, Tommy Sexton, Greg Malone, Andy Jones - Codco (Salter Street Films)
Eugene Levy, David Flaherty, Michael Short - Maniac Mansion (Atlantis Films)
Patrick Granleese - The Woman Who Raised a Bear as Her Son (Lacewood Productions/Hinton Animation Studios/CTV)
Todd Thicke, Jim Slotek, Ted Woloshyn, Ian Anderson - 1991 NHL Awards: A Celebration of Excellence (CBC)
Mike MacDonald - Mike MacDonald: On Target (Howard Lapides Productions)

Best Writing in an Information/Documentary Program or Series
John Zaritsky - Frontline: My Doctor, My Lover (PBS)
Linden MacIntyre, Neil Docherty - the fifth estate (Canadian Broadcasting Corporation)
Claude Vickery - The Code of Silence (TVOntario)
Eric Till - The Sweetest Spring
Amanda McConnell - The Nature of Things - Herschel: An Island of Flowers  (CBC)

Best Performance by an Actor in a Leading Role in a Dramatic Program or Mini-Series
Bernard Behrens - Saying Goodbye (TVOntario)
Len Cariou - Kurt Vonnegut's Monkey House (Atlantis Films/South Pacific Pictures)
Miguel Fernandes - Kurt Vonnegut's Monkey House (Atlantis Films/South Pacific Pictures)
Sean Roberge - C.B.C.'s Magic Hour - The Prom (Atlantis Films)
Yannick Bisson - C.B.C.'s Magic Hour - The Rookies (Atlantis Films)
Victor Garber - The First Circle (Technisonor)

Best Performance by an Actress in a Leading Role in a Dramatic Program or Mini-Series
Brenda Bazinet - Saying Goodbye (TVOntario)
Wendy Crewson - Getting Married in Buffalo Jump (CBC)
Julia Ormond - Young Catherine (CTV/Consolidated Entertainment/Lenfilm/Primedia Productions/Tele München/Turner Entertainment)
Corinne Touzet - The First Circle (Technisonor)

Best Performance by an Actor in a Continuing Leading Dramatic Role
Eric Peterson - Street Legal (CBC)
C. David Johnson - Street Legal (CBC)
Christopher Plummer - Counterstrike (Atlantis Communications/Grosso-Jacobson Productions)
Simon MacCorkindale - Counterstrike (Atlantis Communications/Grosso-Jacobson Productions)
Mickey Rooney - The Adventures of the Black Stallion (Atlantis Communications/Atlantique Productions)

Best Performance by an Actress in a Continuing Leading Dramatic Role
Jackie Burroughs - Road to Avonlea (Sullivan Entertainment)
Sara Botsford - E.N.G. (Atlantis Communications)
Amanda Stepto - Degrassi Junior High (Playing With Time, Inc.)
Cynthia Dale - Street Legal (CBC)
Jennifer Dale - No Place Like Home (CHCH-DT)

Best Guest Performance in a Series by an Actor or Actress
Michelle St. John - E.N.G. - A Long Way from Hopeful" (Atlantis Communications)
Maurice Godin - E.N.G. (Atlantis Communications)
Geza Kovacs - Mom P.I. (Atlantis Films/CBC)
Ron White - Mom P.I. (Atlantis Films/CBC)
Ian Tracey - Mom P.I. (Atlantis Films/CBC)
Marilyn Lightstone - Max Glick (Sunrise Films/FosterFilm Productions)

Best Performance by an Actor in a Supporting Role
Kenneth Welsh - Deadly Betrayal: The Bruce Curtis Story (Atlantis Films/CBC/NFB/Citadel Communications)
Arthur Grosser - Urban Angel (Telescene Films/CBC)
Anthony Sherwood - Street Legal (CBC)
Gordon Michael Woolvett - Princes in Exile (Cinepix/CBC/NFB)
Ian Tracey - C.B.C.'s Magic Hour - The Rookies (Atlantis Films)
Bruce Greenwood - The Little Kidnappers (CBC)

Best Performance by an Actress in a Supporting Role
Sarah Polley - Lantern Hill (Sullivan Entertainment)
Sherry Miller - E.N.G. (Atlantis Communications)
Gema Zamprogna - Road to Avonlea (Sullivan Entertainment)
Lally Cadeau - Road to Avonlea (Sullivan Entertainment)
Marion Gilsenan - Getting Married in Buffalo Jump (CBC)
Leah Pinsent - The Little Kidnappers (CBC)

Best Performance in a Comedy Program or Series
Sandra Shamas - Adrienne Clarkson Presents (CBC) 
Mary Walsh, Cathy Jones, Tommy Sexton, Greg Malone, Andy Jones - Codco (Salter Street Films)
George Buza - Maniac Mansion (Atlantis Films)
Scott Thompson, Mark McKinney, Kevin McDonald, Bruce McCulloch, Dave Foley - ‘’The Kids in the Hall’’ (Broadway Video/CBC)

Best Performance or Host in a Variety Program or Series
k.d. lang, Tommy Banks - 1990 Canadian Country Music Awards (CBC)
Kurt Browning - Tall in the Saddle (Insight Productions)
Celine Dion - Juno Awards of 1991 (CBC)
20/20 - Molson Canadian Rocks Showdown ‘90 (CBC)

Best Performance in a Performing Arts Program or Series
Diana Leblanc - LegacyCarbone 14 - Le Dortoir (Rhombus Media)
Laurel Paetz - Sisters (Primedia Productions)
Karen Kain - Alice (National Ballet of Canada/(CBC)

Gordon Sinclair Award for Broadcast Journalism
Pamela Wallin - CTV News (CTV)
Brian Stewart - The Journal (CBC)
Linden MacIntyre - the fifth estate (Canadian Broadcasting Corporation)
Joe Schlesinger - The National - CBC News (CBC)

Best Reportage
Joe Schlesinger - The National - CBC News (CBC)
Ross Rutherford - CBC News - A Question of Trust (CBC)
Diana Swain - The National - CBC News - Preying on Immigrants (CBC)
Ross Rutherford - CBC News - What About the Kids? (CBC)
Dennis Trudeau - Newswatch (CBC)

Best Anchor or Interviewer
Lloyd Robertson - CTV News - The Gulf War (CTV)
Ralph Benmergui - Midday (Canadian Broadcasting Corporation)
Linden MacIntyre - the fifth estate (Canadian Broadcasting Corporation)
Peter Mansbridge - The National - CBC News (CBC)
Peter Downie - Man Alive (CBC)

Best Host in a Light Information, Variety or Performing Arts Program or Series
David Suzuki - The Nature Connection with David Suzuki (Janson Media)
Adrienne Clarkson - Adrienne Clarkson Presents (CBC) 
Mary Tyler Moore - Just for Laughs ‘91 (Les Films Rozon) 
Wayne Rostad - On the Road Again (CBC)
Dini Petty - The Dini Petty Show (Baton Broadcast System)

Best Sportscaster
Ron MacLean - Molson Legend’s Hockey Night in Canada (CBC)
Don Chevrier - Canada Cup Final (CBC)
John Wells - (TSN)
Don Wittman - CFL on CBC - 1990 Grey Cup (CBC)
Brian Williams - 1990 Molson Indy Vancouver (CBC)

Best Photography in a Dramatic Program or Series
Ron Orieux - The First Circle (Technisonor)
Malcolm Cross - Street Legal (CBC)
Ernest Day - Young Catherine (CTV/Consolidated Entertainment/Lenfilm/Primedia Productions/Tele München/Turner Entertainment)
Miklós Lente - The Little Kidnappers (CBC)
Steve Danyluk - Heritage Minutes (CBC)

Best Photography in a Comedy, Variety or Performing Arts Program or Series
Maris H. Jansons - Tall in the Saddle (Insight Productions)
Alain Dostie - Le Dortoir (Rhombus Media)
Robert Fresco - Musicians in Exile (Jacqués Holender Films)
Hannes Meyer, Michael Storey - Prokofiev by Two (Rhombus Media)
Gilray Densham - Alice (National Ballet of Canada/(CBC)

Best Photography in an Information/Documentary Program or Series
Leonard Gilday - The Nature of Things - Herschel: An Island of Flowers (CBC)
Maurice Chabot - The Journal (CBC)
Mark Mackay - The 12 Steps: Recovering From AddictionsRhett Morita - Diary of a Teenage Smoker (Atlantis Films)
Volodi Ledenov - Polar Bridge: A Canadian-Russian Arctic Odyssey (Keg Productions)

Best News Photography
Jerry Beauchamp - The National - CBC News (CBC)
Howard Cooper - CTV News - The Gulf War (CTV)
Doug Gamey - Global News - The Hunt for Canadian Soldier Eric William Schumacher (Global TV)

Best Picture Editing in a Dramatic Program or Series
Ralph Brunjes - Deadly Betrayal: The Bruce Curtis Story (Atlantis Films/CBC/NFB/Citadel Communications)
Frank Irvine - Kurt Vonnegut's Monkey House (Atlantis Films/South Pacific Pictures)
Richard Todd - Princes in Exile (Cinepix/CBC/NFB)
Jeff Warren - C.B.C.'s Magic Hour - The Rookies (Atlantis Films)
David B. Thompson - Top Cops (C.B.I. of Canada)

Best Picture Editing in a Comedy, Variety or Performing Arts Program or Series
Stephan Fanfara - Maniac Mansion (Atlantis Films)
Miguel Raymond - Le Dortoir (Rhombus Media)
Peter Armstrong, Gilles Saindon - Tall in the Saddle (Insight Productions)
Peter Ovens - Sunday Arts Entertainment (CBC)
Jürg Ingold, Grant Ducsharm - Prokofiev by Two (Rhombus Media)
Peter Svab - Shumka: Return of the Whirlwind (Sulyma Productions)

Best Picture Editing in an Information/Documentary Program or Series
Jack Kuper - A Day in the Warsaw Ghetto: A Birthday Trip in Hell (Kuper Productions)
Christopher Cooper - Diary of a Teenage Smoker (Atlantis Films)
Mike Earls - A White Man’s Game? (Discovery Channel)
Kent Nason, Shelagh MacKenzie - Remember Africville (NFB)
Charles Konowal, Harvey Spak - The Old Believers (NFB)

Best Production Design or Art Direction
Kelly Forrest, Andrew Deskin - C.B.C.'s Magic Hour - Lost in the Barrens (Atlantis Films/Muddy River Films/CBC) 
Harold Thrasher, Natalya Vasilyeva - Young Catherine (CTV/Consolidated Entertainment/Lenfilm/Primedia Productions/Tele München/Turner Entertainment)
Dale Heslip - Juno Awards of 1991 (CBC)
Sheila Haley - Bordertown (Alliance Communications)
Hilary Pryor, Catherine Hahn - Take Off (Canamedia Productions)

Best Costume Design
Martha Mann - Lantern Hill (Sullivan Entertainment)
Larisa Konnikova - Young Catherine (CTV/Consolidated Entertainment/Lenfilm/Primedia Productions/Tele München/Turner Entertainment)
Frances Dafoe - Back to the Beanstalk.
Karen L. Matthews - Max Glick (Sunrise Films/FosterFilm Productions)
Glenne Campbell - Bordertown (Alliance Communications)
Joyce Schure - Battle of the Bulge (Artizzan Films)

Best Sound in a Dramatic Program or Series
Rick Ellis, Bruce Nyznik, Allan Scarth - Deadly Betrayal: The Bruce Curtis Story (Atlantis Films/CBC/NFB/Citadel Communications)
Nolan Roberts, David Midgley, Daniel Latour - E.N.G. (Atlantis Communications)
Gillian Jones, Erik Hoppe, Allen Ormerod - Street Legal - Murder (CBC)
Gorbor Vanay, Les Halman, Hans Peter Strobl - Princes in Exile (Cinepix/CBC/NFB)
Leon Johnson, Joe Grimaldi, Steven Cole - The Challengers (Lauron Productions)

Best Sound in a Comedy, Variety or Performing Arts Program or Series
Daniel Pellerin - Musicians in Exile (Jacqués Holender Films)
Tom Mather, David Evans, Allen Ormerod - Maniac Mansion - Dad’s Bummed Out (Atlantis Films)
Ian Hendry, Doug McClement, Brian Avery - Mariposa: Under a Stormy Sky (Lyric Film and Video)
Steve Wener, François Deschamps, René Beaudry - The Rise and Fall of Humpty Dumpty (Cinar/France Animation)
Paul Myers, Matthew Hutchinson, John Dunkerley - Nights in the Gardens of Spain (EuroArts Music International)

Best Sound in an Information/Documentary Program or Series
Chris Davies - The Journal (CBC)
Ian Hendry, John Martin, Alison Clark - Between Two Worlds (Investigative Productions)
Sergio Penhas-Roll, James Ho Lim, Scott Chisholm - Man Alive (CBC)
Brent Haliskie - W5 With Eric Malling (CTV)
Jean-Pierre Joutel, Haida Paul, Michael McGee - As Long as the Rivers Flow (Tamarack Productions)
Robert Bocking, Jim Frank, Bob Predovich - Profiles Of Nature (Ellis Entertainment)

Best Original Music Score for a Program or Mini-Series
Edmund Eagan - The Woman Who Raised a Bear as Her Son (Lacewood Productions/Hinton Animation Studios/CTV)
Mark Korven - Between Two Worlds (Investigative Productions)
Gaëtan Gravel, Bill Vorn - Le Dortoir (Rhombus Media)
Mark Snow - The Little Kidnappers (CBC)
Jeff Fisher, Judith Henderson - The Rise and Fall of Humpty Dumpty (Cinar/France Animation)

Best Original Music Score for a Series
John Welsman - Road to Avonlea (Sullivan Entertainment)
Graeme Coleman - Max Glick (Sunrise Films/FosterFilm Productions)

Special Awards
Canada Award: Pnina Bloch, Jennifer Campbell, Andy Blicq - DrumsThe John Labatt Entertainment Award for Most Popular Program - Trudy Grant, Kevin Sullivan - Road to Avonlea''
Margaret Collier Award: Harry Rasky
John Drainie Award: Gordon Pinsent
Earle Grey Award: Colleen Dewhurst
Gemini Award for Outstanding Technical Achievement - Telesat, Sky Vision 

06
1991 in Canadian television
1991 television awards